Valldoreix is a community that is part of the Sant Cugat del Vallès municipality, located in the Barcelona province. It has the status of a "" (EMD) within the municipality.

According to a census in 2015 it has 8,096 inhabitants.

Geography 
On the northern edge it connects with Mira-sol, another community in the Sant Cugat del Vallès municipality.

References

External links
 

Populated places in Vallès Occidental
Sant Cugat del Vallès